Huang Qing Zhigong Tu (Collection of Portraits of Subordinate Peoples of the Qing Dynasty) is an 18th-century ethnological study of Chinese tributary states, including Western nations that traded with the Qing Empire. It was published around 1769. The book identified peoples and countries by drawing attention to their national dresses, similarly to European costume books.

The study contained numerous factual errors, such as reporting that France was a Buddhist state before becoming Catholic, that England and Sweden were vassals of Holland, and that France [Falanxi] and Portugal [Folangji] were the same country.

Gallery

See also
 Chinese geography
 Portraits of Periodical Offering

References

1769 books
Ethnology
Chinese non-fiction books
Qing dynasty literature